Kisco Senior Living, based in Carlsbad, California, owns 25 and operates 22 full service senior living communities in six states offering independent living, assisted living and in some locations, memory care.

Statistics
Kisco Senior Living is ranked in the top 50 on the American Seniors Housing Association list of the Nation’s largest senior living owners with a workforce exceeding 2,600 associates and 4,700 residents with 25 communities totaling over 4,600 apartments. The company currently operates in 6 states (California, Florida, North Carolina, Virginia, Utah, and Hawaii). Current product mix includes independent living, assisted living, memory care and continuing care retirement communities. Slightly over one-half of Kisco’s existing inventory is focused on independent living with the remaining units dedicated to assisted living and memory care. A selection of communities feature cottage homes in addition to the main community buildings. Communities range in size from 84 to 350 apartments with an average size of 177 apartments. Annual revenues exceed $300 million and total value of assets under management exceeds $1.9 billion.

Communities 
 Abbotswood at Irving Park
 Abbotswood at Stonehenge
 BridgePoint at Los Altos
 Byron Park
 Cedarwood at Sandy
 Crestavilla
 Drake Terrace
 Emerald Court
 First Colonial Inn
 Heritage Greens
 Ilima at Leihano
 La Posada
 Magnolia Glen
 Park Plaza
 Park Terrace
 Sagewood at Daybreak
 The Cardinal at North Hills
 The Fountains
 The Kensington at Walnut Creek
 Valencia Terrace
 Woodbridge Terrace of Irvine
 Woodland Terrace

Background
Kisco began acquiring properties in 1990 and established its property management company in 1995. Mr. Andrew (Andy) S. Kohlberg is the founder, president and chief executive officer of Kisco Senior Living, LLC.

Awards
Kisco Senior Living and its communities have won several awards from the International Council on Aging, American Senior Housing Association and National Association of Home builders.

References

 Unique Partnership will lead to senior-living campus in Kapolei.  Article by Janis L. Magain.  Published in Pacific Business News on Friday, June 8, 2007.
 Kisco Senior Living commits to enhanced health and wellness of residents.  Article published in The Journal of Active Aging - January/February 2002 edition.

External links
 Kisco Senior Living

Retirement communities
Companies based in Carlsbad, California